Trochosphaeridae is a family of rotifers belonging to the order Flosculariaceae.

Genera:
 Filinia Bory de St.Vincent, 1824
 Horaella Donner, 1949
 Trochosphaera Semper, 1872

References

Flosculariaceae
Rotifer families